The Mary-Sue Extrusion is an original novel by Dave Stone  featuring the fictional archaeologist Bernice Summerfield. The New Adventures were a spin-off from the long-running British science fiction television series Doctor Who.

The title of the book (a reference to a Mary Sue, an authorial wish-fulfillment character) was thought up by Kate Orman, who had been offered the slot, but declined. The title was given instead to Stone, who based the book on material he had written for an abortive standalone science fiction novel.

1999 British novels
1999 science fiction novels
Virgin New Adventures
Bernice Summerfield novels
British science fiction novels
Novels by Dave Stone